"I Can't See Myself Leaving You" is a song written by Ronnie Shannon and performed by Aretha Franklin.  The song reached #3 on the U.S. R&B chart and #28 on the Billboard Hot 100 in 1969.  The song was produced by Jerry Wexler and appeared as the closing track on Franklin's 1968 album, Aretha Now.

Chart performance

Aretha Franklin

References

1968 songs
1969 singles
Aretha Franklin songs
Song recordings produced by Jerry Wexler
Atlantic Records singles
Soul songs
Songs written by Ronnie Shannon